A copy of the Goethe–Schiller Monument is installed in San Francisco's Golden Gate Park, in the U.S. state of California. The statue was dedicated on August 11, 1901.

References

External links
 

Cultural depictions of Friedrich Schiller
Cultural depictions of Johann Wolfgang von Goethe
Golden Gate Park
Monuments and memorials in California
Outdoor sculptures in San Francisco
Sculptures of men in California
Statues in California
Statues of writers